Santa Rita de Cássia Futebol Clube is an Angolan sports club from the city of Uíge.
The team made its debut in the Gira Angola (Angola's second division championship) in 2016 after winning the Uige province football championship.

The club is named after Italian saint Rita of Cascia in whose honor a sanctuary was built at the village of Casseche, Uíge city, where an annual pilgrimage is held. 

In 2016, its debutant year in the second division, the club managed to be promoted to Angola's top flight division, the Girabola.

2017 disaster
On February 10, 2017, shortly after the inaugural match of the 2017 Girabola between home team Santa Rita de Cássia and Recreativo do Libolo, one of the access gates of Estádio 4 de Janeiro collapsed as access was made free and attendants tried to force their way into the stadium. As a result, 17 people were trampled to death and 76 injured, 5 of whom with life-threatening injuries.

Achievements
Angolan League: 0

Angolan Cup: 0

Angolan SuperCup: 0

Gira Angola: 1
 2016
Uige provincial championship: 1
 2015

League & Cup Positions

Recent seasons
Santa Rita de Cássia's season-by-season performance since 2011:

 PR = Preliminary round, 1R = First round, GS = Group stage, R32 = Round of 32, R16 = Round of 16, QF = Quarter-finals, SF = Semi-finals, RU = Runner-Up, W = Winner

Players and staff

Staff

Players

Manager history

See also
Girabola
Gira Angola

References

External links
 Facebook profile

Santa
Football clubs in Angola
Sports clubs in Angola